Jeffrey Owen Holly (born March 1, 1953- February 28, 2019) is a former professional baseball pitcher. He played parts of three seasons in the Major League Baseball from  until , all for the Minnesota Twins.
After the 1979 season he was traded to the Detroit Tigers for Fernando Arroyo.

References

External links

1953 births
Living people
Alacranes de Durango players
American expatriate baseball players in Mexico
Appleton Foxes players
Baseball players from California
Charros de Jalisco players
Gulf Coast White Sox players
Knoxville Sox players
Major League Baseball pitchers
Mexican League baseball pitchers
Minnesota Twins players
Orlando Twins players
People from San Pedro, Los Angeles
Tacoma Twins players
Toledo Mud Hens players